Wickahoney is a ghost town in Owyhee County, Idaho, United States. The town is located in a remote part of southern Owyhee County. It once had its own post office, which doubled as a stagecoach stop on the route from Mountain Home, Idaho to Mountain City, Nevada; the now-abandoned Wickahoney Post Office and Stage Station is listed on the National Register of Historic Places.

References

Geography of Owyhee County, Idaho
Ghost towns in Idaho